The Struthopodes in Medieval bestiaries were a race of humanoids whose males had enormous feet, but whose females had tiny feet.

References 

Medieval European legendary creatures